Mānoa is a valley and a residential neighborhood of Honolulu, Hawaii.

Neighborhood 
Similar to many Honolulu neighborhoods, Mānoa consists of an entire valley, running from Mānoa Falls at the mauka (inland-most) end to King Street.  The valley receives almost daily rain, even during the dry season, and is thus richly vegetated – though the valley walls are often dry.  Seeing rainbows in the valley is a common occurrence, and is the source of the University of Hawaii at Mānoa sports team names, the Rainbow Warriors (for men's teams) and Rainbow Wahine (for the women, with the beach volleyball team more often using SandBows).

The neighborhood is composed of private houses built before the 1960s and low-rise condominiums.  Mānoa is home to the University of Hawaii at Mānoa, the flagship campus of the University of Hawaii System.  The University has several faculty and student residence areas in Mānoa.

Other educational institutions located in Mānoa include Mānoa Elementary School, Noelani Elementary School, Punahou School, Mid-Pacific Institute, Saint Francis School, and a handful of small, private pre-schools.

The central shopping area of Mānoa is the Mānoa Marketplace which features a farmer's market several days of the week.  More recent development has seen housing on steeper parts of the Diamond Head side valley wall.

Geography 
Mānoa means thick, solid, vast, depth or thickness in the Hawaiian language.  There is another valley named Mānoa on the north shore of Kauai.

Mānoa stream begins at the base of Mānoa Falls and runs through the valley before joining Palolo stream to form the Manoa-Palolo drainage canal, which flows into the Ala Wai Canal.  Floods caused by high rainfall have plagued the residents living along Mānoa stream.  Most recent was on October 30, 2004 when Mānoa stream overflowed causing millions of dollars in damages to residential homes and University of Hawaii at Mānoa buildings.

Climate

History 
Mānoa is the site of the first sugarcane and coffee plantations in the Hawaiian Islands.   Hawaiian coffee was first introduced along Manoa Valley in 1813 by Don Francisco de Paula y Marytin as an ornamental plant. In 1825 Chief Boki, the Royal Governor of Oahu, followed up and brought coffee trees back from Brazil on the ship . Chief Boki also chose Manoa Valley as the historic birth site of the very first coffee plantation in Hawaii. With the aid of agriculture expert, John Wilkinson, the coffee trees were able to survive which allowed its descendants to be brought over to Kona and other islands many years later. 
Hawaii is the only state in the United States that produces coffee commercially. For more history see coffee production in Hawaii.

There are many legends associated with Manoa, one very well known legend is the story of Kahalaopuna. Kahalaopuna was born to Kahaukani and Kauakuahine. Kahaukani is the wind of Manoa and Kauakuahine is the rain of Manoa. Kakaukani and Kauakuahine were brother and sister, both born to Akaaka (the projecting spur of the Manoa mountain range) and Nalehuaakaaka (the lehua on the brow of the Manoa ridge).

Education
Hawaii Department of Education operates public schools in Manoa, which is also home to the University of Hawaiʻi at Mānoa.

The private Saint Francis School was in Manoa until its 2019 closure.

Gallery

Points of interest

 Lyon Arboretum
 Mānoa Falls
 Manoa Falls Trail
Manoa Heritage Center
 Salvation Army Waiʻoli Tea Room
 University of Hawaii at Mānoa

References

External links

Manoa